Paraphelenchidae is a family of nematodes belonging to the order Aphelenchida.

Genera:
 Metaphelenchus Steiner, 1944
 Paraphelenchus Micoletzky, 1922

References

Nematodes